The 2016 Evergreen Premier League (referred to as the EPLWA) was the third season of the Evergreen Premier League. The season began on 1 May 2016.

Eight clubs participated.

Vancouver Victory FC won the Evergreen Premier League title.

League table

Results

Top scorers

References

2016
Evergreen